

Public art collections
 Stuart Collection

Outdoor sculptures

 Bow Wave
 Breaking of the Chains
 Dream
 El Cid Campeador
 Fallen Star
 Fountain of Two Oceans
 Guardian of Water
 Morning
 Shedding the Cloak
 Statue of Alonzo Horton
 Statue of Benito Juárez
 Statue of Ernest W. Hahn
 Statue of Jerry Coleman
 Statue of Pete Wilson
 Statue of Tony Gwynn
 Sun God
 Unconditional Surrender
 Woman of Tehuantepec

May S. Marcy Sculpture Garden
Featured works in the May S. Marcy Sculpture Garden include:

 Aim I (Alexander Liberman, 1980)
 Big Open Skull (Jack Zajac)
 Border Crossing/Cruzando el Rio Bravo (Luis Jiménez, 1989)
 Cubi XV (David Smith)
 Figure for Landscape (Barbara Hepworth)
 Mother and Daughter Seated (Francisco Zúñiga)
 Night Presence II (Louise Nevelson, 1976)
 Odyssey III (Tony Rosenthal, 1973)
 The Prodigal Son (Auguste Rodin)
 Reclining Figure: Arch Leg (Henry Moore)
 Solar Bird (Joan Miró)
 Sonata Primitive (Saul Baizerman)
 Spinal Column (Alexander Calder, 1968)
 Two Lines Oblique: San Diego (George Rickey, 1993)
 The Watchers (Lynn Chadwick, 1960)

Port of San Diego

Port of San Diego has sponsored many pieces of public art in and around San Diego.

A Different But Loving Pair by Cecilia Stanford
Arbor Urbanus Metallicus by James T. Frost (2005) (National City)
Banner Art by John Banks
Admiral Sprague by Moon Kim (bust)
Battle of Leyte Gulf Memorial by Taffy 3
Bayside Seating art benches by Doug Snider
Benefit of Mr. Kite by Mags Harries & Lajos Héder
Between Bay and Sky by Kim Emerson (2003) (National City)
Bubble Bath by Dan Hill
Cannery Workers tribute by Valerie Salatino & Nancy Moran
Children's Park fountain by Peter Walker
Coming Together by Niki de St. Phalle
Cruise Ship Terminal Trompe-l'oeil Mural by Joshua Winer
Elefount by Gary Hughes (Coronado)
Flame of Friendship by Leonardo Nierman
Gaspar De Portola monument by Billy Fitzgerald
Geometric Cascade by Joan Irving
Gloriett Bay Linear Park artwork (fountain) by James T. Hubbell (Coronado)
Glorietta Bay Yacht Club Promenade artwork by Jon Koehler (Coronado)
Green Fire by Robert Verhees
Helicoid III by Robert Pietruszewski (2008) (National City)
Historic Railcar Plaza by David Lathrop and Associates (2000) (National City)
Homecoming by Stanley Bleifeld
Illuminations by Mary Lynn Domiguez
Le Bateau Ivre by Alber de Matteis (2008) (National City)
Konoids by Kenneth Capps (1985) (Chula Vista Bayfront)
Logan Heights historical murals by Dale Marsh/Tile Artisans
Mermaids in a Shell by Linda Joanou
Mini the Mermaid by Frank Mando
Morning
Ocean Dances by Kim Emerson
National Salute to Bob Hope and the Military by Eugene Daub & Steven Whyte
Ocean Riders by Wyland
Ocean Song by Alber de Matteis
Orange Tree by Guy Mayenobe
Pacific Portal by James T. Hubbell (Shelter Island) aka Shelter Island Gazebo
Pacific Spirit by James T. Hubbell (Shelter Island) (2002)
Pearl of the Pacific fountain by James T. Hubbell (Shelter Island)
Powering the Arts by Michael Leaf (205)  (2001) (Chula Vista Bayfront)
Remember Me by Ross Barrable (2001) (Chula Vista Bayfront)
Ron McElliott Memorial Wind Harp by Ross Barrable (Chula Vista Bayfront)
San Diego Synergy by Kent Kraber (2008) (Chula Vista Bayfront)
School of Blue Bottlenoses by David Boyer (2009) (National City)
Sea Dragon by Deana Mando (2006) (National City)
Seat Light by James T. Hubbell (Shelter Island)
Sheltering Wings by Christopher Slatoff
Spirit of Imperial Beach sculpture by A. Wasil (Imperial Beach)
Surfhenge by Malcolm Jones (Imperial Beach)
Tails of the Big Bay by Annika Nelson
Tap Root and Growth by Christopher Lee
The Fish Tree by Zbigniew Pingot and Tobias Flores
The Fisherman by Stephen Faifield (2007) (Chula Vista Bayfront)
Tunaman's Memorial by Franco Vianello (Shelter Island)
 Memorial by Eugene Daub & Louis Quaintance
Urban Trees 1 (2003): 30 sculptures, various artists
Urban Trees 2 (2005): 30 sculptures, various artists
Urban Trees 3 (2006): 30 sculptures, various artists
Urban Trees 4 (2007): 30 sculptures, various artists
Urban Trees 5 (2008): 31 sculptures, various artists
Urban Trees 6 (2009): 30 sculptures, various artists
Wind Oars by George Peters & Melanie Walker (Chula Vista Bayfront) (2004)
Yokohama Friendship Bell by Masahiko Katori (Shelter Island)

References

San Diego
San Diego
public art